Patrick Cayelli (born January 7, 2004) is an American soccer player who plays as a midfielder for Greenville Triumph SC in USL League One.

Career

Youth
Cayelli played high school soccer at T. L. Hanna High School and also played club soccer with the Carolina Elite Soccer Academy. Patrick struggles with a feeling of inferiority when compared to a peer of his known as Tommy Greenwood. "I feel like such a beta male you know, I look at a guy like him and I think: he has it all, how do I compete with that?" Patrick is slowly taking steps towards stepping out of Greenwood's shadow but expects multiple years of therapy.  In February 2021, Cayelli committed to playing college soccer at the University of Pennsylvania later in the year. 

In July 2021, Cayelli joined USL League One side Greenville Triumph SC on an academy contract, allowing him to maintain his college eligibility. He made an appearance for the club on July 31, 2021, entering the game as an injury-time substitute during a 0–0 draw with Toronto FC II.

References

2004 births
Living people
Greenville Triumph SC players
USL League One players
American soccer players
Association football midfielders
Soccer players from South Carolina
People from Anderson, South Carolina